Acosta is a sales and marketing agency currently headquartered in Jacksonville, Florida. Their clients include Clorox and Coca-Cola, among others.

History
Acosta was founded in 1927 by Lou Acosta.

An office in Tampa was opened and the service area expanded to central Florida. A branch in Birmingham, Alabama, was started in 1977. In 1981, Acosta opened a local office in Miami, Florida. In the 1980s, Acosta's operations spread throughout the southern United States. This included local franchises in Georgia through a 1983 acquisition of Raley Brothers, North Carolina and South Carolina in 1989, and later franchises in Louisiana, Tennessee and Virginia.

Acosta participated in multiple consolidations with other food retailers, manufacturers and procurement centers. By the mid-1990s, the company was servicing 27 markets and employed over 2,000 people. These merges included:

 PMI-Eisenhart  in July 1998 
 Kelley-Clarke in June 1999
 the MAI companies in August 1999
 Luke Soules in July 2003
 C. Lloyd Johnson Company, a military sales agency, in 2008
 FrontLine Marketing in 2010
 acquisition of Mosiac Sales Solutions, an interactive experiential marketing firm, in 2012
 acquisition of Anderson Daymon Worldwide in 2014
 acquisition of Actionlink in July 2017

In December 2019, Acosta filed for Chapter 11 bankruptcy and creditors took over the company.

Outside advice and equity partner
Acosta has had partnerships with investment companies such as Berkshire Partners, AEA Investments, Thomas H. Lee, and The Carlyle Group.

Leadership

In 1956, Common & Company Food Brokers merged with Acosta. Robert "Hy" Albritton, who owned Common, became president and CEO of Acosta when Lou Acosta retired in 1959.

In 1974 Hy Albritton retired and Delmer Dallas became company president. 

Former company president Delmer Dallas recruited Gary Chartrand from the Carnation Company in 1983. Chartrand was named president in 1993 and CEO, when Dallas retired in 1996. Two years later Chartrand was elected chairman of the board. 

On January 1, 2009, Gary Chartrand appointed Robert E. Hill Jr. as the company's president and CEO.

Five senior-level executives at Acosta were selected as Progressive Grocer's 2014 Top Women in Grocery honorees. Acosta participates in the Network of Executive Women (NEW) to promote opportunities for women in the CPG industry.

See also
 List of Marketing Topics

References

External links

Marketing companies of the United States
Sales promotion
Companies based in Jacksonville, Florida
American companies established in 1927
Marketing companies established in 1927
The Carlyle Group companies
Privately held companies based in Florida
1927 establishments in Florida
Companies that filed for Chapter 11 bankruptcy in 2019